Amphimallon pini is a species of beetle in the Melolonthinae subfamily that can be found in France Italy, and Spain.

References

Beetles described in 1789
pini
Beetles of Europe